Hydroxycitric acid (HCA) is a derivative of citric acid that is found in a variety of tropical plants including Garcinia cambogia and Hibiscus sabdariffa.

There are four isomers, (+)- and (-)-hydroxycitric acid, and (+)- and (-)-allo-hydroxycitric acid. The (-)-hydroxycitric acid isomer is the one found in Garcinia.

Chemistry
Hydroxy citric acid as such cannot be isolated from garcinia fruits or hibiscus sabdariffa fruits. Hydroxy citric acid exist  in both the open and lactone forms. The presence of two chiral centres in the molecule is exploited to construct molecular skeletons that are otherwise difficult to synthesize, thus demonstrating the lactones use as chirons.

Biological effects
(-)-HCA is a competitive inhibitor of  ATP citrate lyase, which converts citrate into oxaloacetate and acetyl CoA. The reverse of this conversion is a step in the citric acid cycle.

Laboratory and animal studies of HCA have produced results that indicate a potential for modulation of lipid metabolism. However, a clinical study has demonstrated that HCA has no effect in terms of weight loss or reduction of fat mass. A meta-analysis published in 2010 revealed that gastrointestinal adverse effects were twice as likely for users of hydroxycitric acid.
The use of HCA is contraindicated in patients suffering Colitis or Inflammatory Bowel Disease.

One isomer of HCA, known as (2S,3R)-HCA, inhibits pancreatic alpha-amylase and intestinal alpha-glucosidase, leading to a reduction in carbohydrate metabolism in vitro. In a study in Zucker rats, which are genetically predisposed to obesity, Garcinia cambogia  extract containing HCA showed that high doses led to significant suppression of epididymal fat accumulation, but also had high testicular toxicity. However, this study has been criticized because of possible contamination of the HCA used and various design flaws.

Researchers at the University of Houston reported hydroxycitrate is capable of dissolving calcium oxalate crystals, a component of human kidney stones. Recent studies (2019) shows kidney stones are layered and the stones may form and dissolve with time. The researchers believe the effect could lead to the development of new drugs for human kidney stones.

References

Dietary supplements
Tricarboxylic acids
Alpha hydroxy acids